The Sussex County Miners are a professional independent league baseball team based in the Augusta section of Frankford Township in Sussex County, New Jersey, United States. The Miners are members of the East Division of the Frontier League, an independent baseball league which is not affiliated with Major League Baseball. They were originally members of the Canadian American Association of Professional Baseball (Can-Am League) and joined for the 2015 season. They joined the Frontier League for the 2020 season when it absorbed the Can-Am League. 

The Miners' home stadium is Skylands Stadium, in Augusta near the Sussex County Fairgrounds.

The team is owned by Sussex Professional Baseball, LLC. The Miners' mascot is Herbie the Miner.

History of professional baseball in Sussex County
Skylands Stadium, originally called Skylands Park, opened in 1994. The stadium was built for the relocating Glens Falls Redbirds, who at the time were the St. Louis Cardinals' New York–Penn League affiliate and were playing in Glens Falls, New York at East Field. The team was relocating for the second time in as many years after playing in Hamilton, Ontario in 1992.

The team became known as the New Jersey Cardinals after moving to Sussex County and played there until 2005. Following the season, the Cardinals announced they were relocating their New York–Penn League affiliate to University Park, Pennsylvania, where it became known as the State College Spikes.

The Can-Am League announced shortly after the Cardinals' move was made official that they would be expanding for the 2006 season and adding a team in Sussex County. Owned by the same ownership group that held the New Jersey Jackals, the new team was named the Sussex Skyhawks after a contest where fans submitted names. The Skyhawks won the league championship in 2008, but folded in 2010.

Skylands Park was also a temporary home for the Newark Bears of the Atlantic League of Professional Baseball in their inaugural season; the Bears played their first 20 home games there while Riverfront Stadium in Newark was being built.

In 2014, after purchasing Skylands Stadium the year before, Dorso officially announced the arrival of the Miners, who began play the following season. The Miners struggled their first two seasons, finishing last and second-to-last in the league and missing the playoffs both season. 

In the 2017 season, the Miners qualified for the playoffs for the first time in franchise history. However, they got swept 3-0 in the opening round by the eventual champions, the Quebec Capitales. The following season, the Miners won their first regular season title, placing first in the league. On September 9, 2018, the Miners defeated the Trois-Rivières Aigles in the opening round series 3-2 to advance to their first championship round in franchise history. The following series, they defeated the Quebec Capitales 3-1 in the championship series to earn their first league championship, winning on a dramatic walk-off home run by Martin Figueroa. The Miners were almost able to replicate their success the following season, finishing first in the regular season standings and winning their opening round series against the Rockland Boulders. In the championship series, however, they lost 3-1 to their in-state rival New Jersey Jackals, also owned by Dorso.

Following the 2019 season, it was announced that the Can-Am League, along with five of its six teams, would be absorbed by the Frontier League. Due to the COVID-19 pandemic, however, the Frontier League announced there would be no season this year. Instead, the Miners would play in the local All-American Baseball Challenge, a six-team league introduced to entertain fans during the pandemic. Skylands Stadium hosted the Miners and the Skylands Cardinals, a team introduced for the challenge that referenced the area's baseball history. The Miners had a stellar regular season in the Challenge, finishing first in the league's standings, but fell to the New York Brave in the opening round, eliminating them from the championship game. The Miners finished third in the Challenge after beating the Jersey Wise Guys in the third place game. 

In 2021, the Miners officially began Frontier League play, but missed the playoffs after finishing second in the Northeast Division. As of 2022, the Miners play in the League's East Division, along with the Capitales, Jackals, Aigles, Tri-City ValleyCats, New York Boulders, Ottawa Titans, and Empire State Greys.

Season-by-season records

Current roster

Notable alumni
 Reggie Abercrombie (2015)
 Ray Sadler (2015)
 Robb Paller (2016)
 Adron Chambers (2017)
 David Rollins (2018)
 Kalian Sams (2019)
 Nick Shumpert (2019–2020)
 Cito Culver (2019–2022)
 Vin Mazzaro (2020, 2022–present)
 Tyler Danish (2020)
 Todd Frazier (2021)

References

External links
 

2015 establishments in New Jersey
Canadian American Association of Professional Baseball teams
Frankford Township, New Jersey
Baseball teams established in 2015
Professional baseball teams in New Jersey